Pachystyla waynepagei was a species of small air-breathing land snail, a terrestrial pulmonate gastropod mollusk in the family Euconulidae, the hive snails. This species was native to Mauritius; it is extinct.

References

 Griffiths, O. (2000). Nine new species of Mascarene land snails (Mollusca: Gastropoda). Molluscan Research 20: 37–50.

waynepagei
Gastropods described in 2000